Bowman Dam can refer to:

 Arthur R. Bowman Dam in Crook County, Oregon
 Bowman Dam (California) in Nevada County, California
 Bowman-Haley Dam in Bowman County, North Dakota